Lalleu is a commune in the Ille-et-Vilaine department in Brittany in northwestern France.

Geography
The stream de la Couyère forms all of the commune's eastern border, then flows into the Semnon, which forms all of its southern border.

Population
Inhabitants of Lalleu are called Allodiens in French.

See also
Communes of the Ille-et-Vilaine department

References

External links

Mayors of Ille-et-Vilaine Association 

Communes of Ille-et-Vilaine